Lavoy is a hamlet in central Alberta, Canada, within the County of Minburn No. 27.

Demographics 
Lavoy recorded a population of 108 in the 2001 Census of Population conducted by Statistics Canada.

See also 
List of communities in Alberta
List of former urban municipalities in Alberta
List of hamlets in Alberta

References 

Hamlets in Alberta
Former villages in Alberta
County of Minburn No. 27
Populated places disestablished in 1999